84th NYFCC Awards
January 2018

Best Picture: 
Roma

The 84th New York Film Critics Circle Awards, honoring the best in film for 2018, were announced on November 29, 2018.

Winners

Best Film
Roma
Best Director
Alfonso Cuarón – Roma
Best Actor
Ethan Hawke – First Reformed
Best Actress
Regina Hall – Support the Girls
Best Supporting Actor
Richard E. Grant – Can You Ever Forgive Me?
Best Supporting Actress
Regina King – If Beale Street Could Talk
Best Screenplay
Paul Schrader – First Reformed
Best Animated Film
Spider-Man: Into the Spider-Verse
Best Cinematography
Alfonso Cuarón – Roma
Best Non-Fiction Film
Minding the Gap
Best Foreign Language Film
Cold War • Poland
Best First Film
Bo Burnham – Eighth Grade
Special Award
David Schwartz
Pioneers: First Women Filmmakers

References

External links
 

New York Film Critics Circle Awards
New York
2018 in American cinema
New
2018 in New York City